Matthew Liam Revis (born 15 November 2001) is an English cricketer. He made his first-class debut on 16 September 2019, for Yorkshire in the 2019 County Championship. He made his Twenty20 debut 17 September 2020, for Yorkshire in the 2020 T20 Blast. He made his List A debut on 22 July 2021, for Yorkshire in the 2021 Royal London One-Day Cup.

References

External links
 

2001 births
Living people
English cricketers
Yorkshire cricketers
Place of birth missing (living people)
English cricketers of the 21st century